Lozova Raion is a raion in Kharkiv Oblast in eastern Ukraine. Its administrative center is the city of Lozova. Current population: 

On 18 July 2020, as part of the administrative reform of Ukraine, the number of raions of Kharkiv Oblast was reduced to seven, and the area of Lozova Raion was significantly expanded. Two abolished raions, Blyzniuky and Pervomaiskyi Raions, as well as Lozova Municipality and the city of Pervomaiskyi, which was previously incorporated as a city of oblast significance, were merged into Lozova Raion. The January 2020 estimate of the raion population was

Subdivisions

Current
After the reform in July 2020, the raion consisted of 5 hromadas:
 Biliaivka rural hromada with the administration in the settlement of Biliaivka, transferred from Pervomaiskyi Raion; 
 Blyzniuky settlement hromada with the administration in the urban-type settlement of Blyzniuky, transferred from Blyzniuky Raion;
 Lozova urban hromada with the administration in the city of Lozova, retained from Lozova Raion and transferred from Lozova Municipality;
 Oleksiivka rural hromada with the administration in the village of Oleksiivka, transferred from Pervomaiskyi Raion;
 Pervomaiskyi urban hromada, with the administration in the city of Pervomaiskyi, transferred from the city of oblast significance of Pervomaiskyi.

Before 2020

At the time of disestablishment, the raion consisted of one hromada, Lozova urban hromada with the administration in Lozova. The hromada also included Lozova Municipality.

References

 
Raions of Kharkiv Oblast
1923 establishments in Ukraine